The "Mountain Attack" is an annual Austrian ski mountaineering competition, carried out near Saalbach since 1999.

The competition is separated in a short distance and a long distance course, each offered for a female and a male racer class. There is a separate ranking of racers, older than 45 years. The marathon track passes six summits, and includes an altitude difference of 3,000 meters for the total ascent and for skiing down.

Best marathon racers 
(since 2004: "Mountain Man")

Best female racer was Simone Hornegger from 2002 to 2006 (in a row), and from 2007 to 2009 Francesca Martinelli won the race in series. In 2010, Michaela Eßl placed first, in 2011 Mireia Miró Varela, and in 2012 Michaela Eßl once again.

External links 
 Official site

References 

Ski mountaineering competitions
Sport in Salzburg (state)
International sports competitions hosted by Austria
Kitzbühel Alps
1999 establishments in Austria
Recurring sporting events established in 1999